Owen Brown (born 4 September 1960) is a footballer who played as a forward. He is best known for his stints in the Football League with Tranmere Rovers.

Brown moved into coaching after his playing career ended, with Prescot Cables. From 1996 to 1999, he was manager of Barrow, winning the UniBond Premier title in 1998. With the club struggling in the Conference, Brown was sacked the following year. He then took up a job coaching Liverpool's under-19 side, and later worked as a coach for Altrincham.

In 2001, Brown was appointed manager of Droylsden, but was sacked after a few weeks in charge. In 2002, Brown was the joint caretaker manager of Chester City. In 2003, Brown was appointed manager of Vauxhall Motors, succeeding Alvin McDonald. He resigned two years later, following a run of seven defeats that left the club rooted to the bottom of the Conference North.

At Liverpool, he worked in various positions, including as a scout, player liaison officer and advisor to then-manager Rafael Benítez.

References

External links
 

1960 births
Living people
Footballers from Liverpool
Association football forwards
English footballers
Liverpool F.C. players
Carlisle United F.C. players
Tranmere Rovers F.C. players
Crewe Alexandra F.C. players
Chester City F.C. players
Hyde United F.C. players
English Football League players
Barrow A.F.C. managers
Droylsden F.C. managers
Chester City F.C. managers
English football managers